Four wall paddleball, or paddleball, is a popular court sport in the Upper Midwest of the United States (particularly in Michigan and Wisconsin), on the West Coast of the U.S. (particularly in southern California) and in the Memphis, Tennessee area. It is played with a paddle and small rubber ball on a standard handball or racquetball court, with similar rules to those sports.

History
Four wall paddleball was invented in 1930 by Earl Riskey, a physical-education instructor and later Director of Intramural Sports at the University of Michigan. The paddleball trophy, awarded annually to the person who has done the most for the game, bears Riskey's name.

The university's Intramural Sports Building was built with a large number of squash and handball courts, and the school's tennis players often practiced on them during bad weather. Sometimes they used wooden paddles from paddle tennis instead of tennis rackets for their workouts. Riskey thought that a game played with paddles on a handball court might be a good addition to the intramural program. The courts at the Intramural Sports Building in Ann Arbor are still the site for many national championship tournaments.

Other sports (notably paddle tennis) used paddles, but the ball proved more difficult to create. Riskey found that if the fuzzy surface was removed from a tennis ball, the resulting ball had a suitable bounce for the game. Dime-store rubber balls were also used. The choice of ball remains one of the most contentious issues of the sport today. There are standard paddleballs (made by Ektelon), but the sport is also played with a racquetball. This difference changes how the game is played. For instance, when playing with a standard paddleball the ceiling ball is an impractical shot; however, when playing with a racquetball the ceiling ball is the shot of choice.

The game
Paddleball can be played with two players (singles), three players ("cut throat"), or four players (doubles). The rules of paddleball are similar to indoor racquetball, and both sports are played on the same  court. The most-significant differences between paddleball and racquetball are:
 Paddleball players play with a solid paddle, rather than a strung racket.
 A paddleball is slower (and slightly larger) than a racquetball.
 Paddleball games are played to 21 points, instead of 15 or 11 (as in racquetball).

There are other minor differences, but racquetball players tend to pick up the sport quickly and many players are good in both. Marty Hogan, Charlie Brumfield and Bud Muehleisen, for instance, each held national open titles in both sports; Hogan held both national open titles during the same year.

The differences in the paddle and the ball make for longer rallies than in racquetball, and use more of the court. As a consequence paddleball tends to be more physical, and contact between players (while discouraged) occurs more often than in racquetball. Playing the sport at the highest level requires an advanced degree of fitness and endurance, similar to that required by squash.

The official governing organization for paddleball is the National Paddleball Association (NPA), whose website is the official source for current rules and tournament schedules.

Equipment
The official paddleball ball is an unpressurized black ball with a small hole, slightly larger and heavier than a racquetball. Early in the sport's history, many of the better players honed their paddles and guarded their designs. Other players—most notably Bud Muehleisen—started with commercial paddles by Spalding or Marcraft, and modified them to meet their personal preferences. Old tennis rackets could be cut down into paddles, and these "paddle rackets" (as they were called) gave a player such an advantage over a standard wooden paddle that a new game evolved from it.

Competitive paddles are still made in small shops, but the technology has advanced beyond early paddles. Modern paddles combine polymer foams, high-strength metals, graphite and epoxy resin. Paddles are made in home shops by craftsmen such as eight-time national champion Mike Wisniewski of Bay City, Michigan, who builds a few paddles—more than needed for personal use, but not enough to be considered a manufacturer. These "Wiz paddles" are well-enough made that they are often kept on display when not in use. A few small manufacturers (notably Hillbilly Paddles) produce hundreds of paddles per year.

Related games
Several games are similar to four wall paddleball, and some are played on the same court:
 Handball, from which four wall paddleball was derived, is played with both hands and no paddle.
 Racquetball, derived from four wall paddleball, uses a racket tethered to one hand.

Similar games are played on different courts:
 One wall paddleball, using the same type of paddle but played outdoors against a single wall with a different ball.
 Three wall paddleball, using the same type of paddle but played on dedicated outdoor courts with sidewalls coming back to the service line.
 Paddle tennis, using similar paddles and played on a court similar to a tennis court.

Squash is a somewhat-similar game, played with a long-handled racket on a similar (but different-sized) court. The court is shorter and wider, and the ceiling and bottom  of the front wall are out of bounds. The rules of squash are also different. It is considered a more-defensive game than paddleball, while racquetball is considered more offensive.

Men's champions

The table below has been sourced from information on the NPA website:

References

Sports originating in the United States
Wall and ball games